Stonewall is a neighborhood in southwestern Lexington, Kentucky, United States. Its boundaries are Clays Mill Road to the east, Man O War Boulevard to the south, New Circle Road to the north, and a combination of Hyde Park Drive, Blenheim Way, and Gladman Way to the west.

Statistics
 Population in 2000: 2,458
 Land area: 1.262
 Population density: 1,948
 Median income: $85,680

External links
 http://www.city-data.com/neighborhood/Stonewall-Community-Lexington-KY.html

Neighborhoods in Lexington, Kentucky